Anacampsis niveopulvella, the pale-headed aspen leafroller moth, is a moth of the family Gelechiidae. It was described by Vactor Tousey Chambers in 1875. It is found in North America, where it has been recorded from Alberta, Arizona, British Columbia, California, Indiana, Maine, Manitoba and Ontario.

The wingspan is about 12 mm. The forewings are very dark brown, with a white spot on the disc before the middle and two or three small ones behind the middle, and an irregular white fascia posteriorly angulated at the beginning of the cilia. Under the lens, the wing appears to be pretty densely dusted with white and the spots are only aggregations of the dusting.

The larvae feed on Salix and Populus species.

References

Moths described in 1875
Anacampsis
Moths of North America